Rugao is a county-level city under the administration of Nantong, Jiangsu province, China, located in the Yangtze River Delta on the northern (left) bank of the river.

History

In 411, the western part of then Hailing (Taizhou) was separated from the county to create Rugao county, which named after a coastal village. During Sui dynasty, the county was merged into Ninghai county. Restored in 952, the county was transferred to then Tongzhou in 1724. Around the 1930s, Rugao was the most populous county in then Jiangsu province. Two county governments of the New Fourth Army were established in the then county: Ruxi (literally Western Rugao) and Rugao (1940–5, was renamed as Rudong by the CPC in November 1945 ), while the Tongzhou-Yangzhou Canal marked the boundary between the two regions, during the Second Sino-Japanese War. Ruxi succeed to the designation Rugao in 1945, the reshuffling of territory came true only in January 1949, when the CPC totally controlled the area. On 1 June 1990, with approval of the State Council, Rugao was turned into a county-level city, which went into effect in 1991.

Administrative divisions 
In the present, Rugao City has one subdistrict and 19 towns.
1 subdistrict
 Rucheng
 
19 towns

Climate

Education
 

Baipu Middle school (1950)

Tourism
Shuihui Garden
Lingwei Taoist Temple
Red Army Memorial Museum

Notable people
Henry Lee, criminologist
Zhu Qianhua, writer
Huang Beijia, writer
Xiaowei Zhuang, biophysicist
Zhu Meifang, materials scientist

References

External links
 Rugao government
 Rugao City English guide (Jiangsu.NET)
 "Illustrated Album of Yangzhou Prefecture", from 1573 to 1620, has illustrations of Rugao

Cities in Jiangsu
Nantong
County-level divisions of Jiangsu